Atomic Cafe: Greatest Songs Live is the second live album released by the band The Motels, recorded live in Boston in 1979 & 1980.

Track listing
All songs written by Martha Davis, except where noted.
"Atomic Cafe" – 2:58
"Closets and Bullets" – 4:43
"Kix" – 2:16
"Celia" – 3:06
"Total Control" (Davis, Jeff Jourard) – 5:26
"People, Places and Things" – 3:54
"Porn Reggae / The Big Hurt" (Davis / Wayne Shanklin) – 6:30
"Dressing Up" (Davis, J. Jourard) – 5:04
"Careful" (Marty Jourard, Michael Goodroe) – 3:09
"Days Are OK (But the Nights Are Made for Love) / Atomic Cafe (version 2)" (Tim McGovern / Davis) – 6:38
"Bonjour Baby" (M. Jourard, Goodroe) – 3:21
"Whose Problem?" – 3:33
"Cry Baby" (M. Jourard, Goodroe) – 4:06
"Danger" (Davis, McGovern) – 4:35
"Party Professionals" – 4:07
"Anticipating" – 4:18

References

2008 live albums
The Motels albums